The Hospital of la Venerable Orden Tercera (Spanish: Hospital de la Venerable Orden Tercera) is a former hospital located in Madrid, Spain. It was declared Bien de Interés Cultural in 1995.

References 

Buildings and structures in Palacio neighborhood, Madrid
Bien de Interés Cultural landmarks in Madrid